Sarab-e Bardeh Zanjir, also rendered as Sarab-e Bard Zanjir, may refer to:
 Sarab-e Bardeh Zanjir-e Olya
 Sarab-e Bardeh Zanjir-e Sofla